Aníbal Alzate Sosa (31 January 1933 – 31 March 2016) was a Colombian footballer. He competed for the Colombia national football team at the 1962 FIFA World Cup which was held in Chile.

References

1933 births
2016 deaths
Colombian footballers
Colombia international footballers
1962 FIFA World Cup players
Categoría Primera A players
Deportes Tolima footballers
Association football defenders